William Elphinstone (1431–1514) was a Scottish bishop.

William Elphinstone may also refer to:

Sir William Elphinstone, (died 1645), secretary to Elizabeth Stuart, Queen of Bohemia
William George Keith Elphinstone (1782–1842), British Army officer
William Elphinstone, 15th Lord Elphinstone (1828–1893), Scottish peer
William Fullerton Elphinstone (1740–1834) East India Company ship's captain and Director.

See also
Elphinstone (surname)